Darius Olavi Koski (born January 3, 1971) is the US-American lead guitarist and songwriter of the punk rock band Swingin' Utters, the alternative punk rock bands Filthy Thievin' Bastards and the Re-volts. He also works as a plumber.

Koski has produced such acts as the Workin' Stiffs (Liquid Courage, 1999), Reducers SF (Backing the Long Shot, 1999), and The Truents (Every Day of the Week, 1999).

References

Living people
American punk rock guitarists
American male guitarists
1971 births
21st-century American guitarists
21st-century American male musicians